Highway 316 is a highway in the Canadian province of Saskatchewan. It runs from Highway 16 near Clavet to Highway 5. Highway 316 is about 17 km (11 mi.) long.  This area is an industrial commercial area along Highway #316 which extends from Clavet north to the PCS Patience Lake Mine which is just 10 miles from the city of Saskatoon.  Highway 316 is a primary weight highway, and also runs near the Canadian National Railway line which goes from Saskatoon through Clavet. In 1941, the Canadian Pacific Railway ran from Saskatoon through Cheviot and on south eastward.

Highway 316 passes near the community of Cheviot and intersects Highway 394.

Communities along the route
Cheviot, Saskatchewan, a small unincorporated area was the childhood home of  Neil McArthur inducted into the Saskatchewan Agricultural Hall of Fame.
Muskeg Lake First Nation Indian Reserve 102A

Rural municipalities along the route
Blucher No. 343 is home to several industrial/commercial enterprises. Potash mining, anhydrous ammonia-bulk fertilizer distribution centres, canola crushing plant, as well as a large inland grain terminal.

Major attractions
Potash Corporation of Saskatchewan (PCS) Patience Lake Mine

The following lakes are all north of Highway 316:

 Porter Lake    or legal land description of Township 37- Ranges 2,3 - W of the 3rd Meridian

References

External links
Saskatchewan Highways Website-- Highway Numbering 
Saskatchewan Road Map RV Itineraries 
Big Things of Canada, A Celebration of Community Monuments of Canada 

316